"Pasos de cero" (roughly "Steps from scratch") is a song recorded by Spanish singer-songwriter Pablo Alborán. It was released as the second single from his third studio album, Terral. The song was written by Alborán and produced by Eric Rosse.

A French version was released in July 2015 as "Inseparables" as a duet with French singer Zaz. Alborán and Zaz had collaborated a month earlier on the track, "Sous le ciel de Paris" which was included on Zaz's 2014 album, Paris.

The track was included in a special French edition of Alborán’s album Terral, released in January 2016.

Music video
The music video for "Pasos de cero" was directed by Gus Carballo and filmed in Málaga in December 2014. The clip was released on 21 January 2015.

The music video for "Inseparables" was released on 1 September 2015.

Chart performance

"Pasos de cero"

"Inséparables"

See also
 List of number-one singles of 2014 (Spain)

Release history

References 

2014 singles
Number-one singles in Spain
Pablo Alborán songs
2014 songs
Warner Music Group singles
Songs written by Pablo Alborán